Jefferson Luis Teixeira Silva (born 23 November 1983 in Guaíba) is a Brazilian football player. He was playing for São José de Porto Alegre and signed with Coritiba in April 2010. In January 2011, he moved to  Guarani Futebol Clube on loan.

Football career
Jefferson started his professional career at São Paulo (RS). On 30 January 2004, he transferred to Slavia Praha. He then left for Central Español, and returned to Brazil for São José de Porto Alegre
on 8 March 2005. He left for Central Español again, and returned to Brazil on 27 January 2006, for Aparecidense. He left for General Caballero in second half of 2006 season, and returned to Brazil for São José de Porto Alegre on 24 January 2007, signed a one and a half year deal. On 19 September 2007, he was loaned to Criciúma of Série B until end of year.

In the first semester of 2010, Jefferson played the Campeonato Gaúcho for São José, 4th placed in the competition, and he was the best scorer of the whole championship, with 13 goals. Because of this performance, he was contracted by Coritiba to play the Campeonato Brasileiro Série B.

References

External links
 Brazilian FA Database

1983 births
Living people
Brazilian footballers
Criciúma Esporte Clube players
Central Español players
Czech First League players
SK Slavia Prague players
Association football midfielders
Footballers from Porto Alegre
Sport Club São Paulo players
Guarani FC players
Coritiba Foot Ball Club players
Expatriate footballers in Paraguay
Expatriate footballers in Uruguay